"Stand by U" is South Korean pop group Tohoshinki's twenty-eighth Japanese language single. "Stand by U" was released on July 1, 2009 by their label Rhythm Zone and was released in two formats: CD and CD+DVD. The track serves as the final single promoted by the group as a five-piece, following which legal troubles caused the group to go on an extended hiatus.

Background
Shortly after the release of their twenty-seventh Japanese language single, "Share the World/We Are!", news about the group recording the single started to surfaced online.

Chart performance
Upon the release of the single in Japan, it took the number two spot on the Oricon daily chart selling over 94,800 copies. On July 5, 2009 daily chart the single peaked at the number-one spot selling nearly 29,300 copies. On the issue date of July 13, 2009, "Stand by U" debuted at number two on the Oricon weekly chart behind pop boy band  Arashi's "Everything"; selling a little more than 182,060 copies.

Music video
Like their twenty-third Japanese single, "Dōshite Kimi o Suki ni Natte Shimattandarō?", two music videos were shot for "Stand by U": drama version and version with Tohoshinki's members. As the song was used as the theme song for Japanese mobile drama Sweet Room, the music video features the characters of the first story Last Love starring Narimiya Hiroki as the male lead and Yukari Shiomi as the female lead.

Live performance
On June 20, 2009, Tohoshinki appeared on Music Fair and performed "Stand by U" as well as "Sky". They also appeared on other shows such as NHK Save the Future 2009, Music Station and Music Japan, performing "Stand by U".

Track list

Credits
Vocals: Tohoshinki
Recording: Hideaki Jinbu ("Stand by U", "Tea for Two" and "Sky"), Masahiro Kawata ("Stand by U")
Location: Avex Studio Azabu, Sony Music Studio ("Stand by U", "Tea for Two" and "Stand by U: Luv Behind the Mld Mix"), Prime Sound Studio Aoyama ("Sky")
Mix engineers: Naoki Yamada ("Stand by U", "Tea for Two" and "Sky"), Masahiro Kawata ("Stand by U: Luv Behind the Mld Mix")
Music: Uta and Reo ("Stand by U), Ichiro Fujiya ("Tea for Two"), H-wonder ("Sky")
Music director: Katsutoshi Yasuhara

Charts, peaks and certifications

Charts

Sales and certifications

Release history

References

2009 singles
TVXQ songs
Japanese-language songs
2009 songs
Rhythm Zone singles